Expedited removal is a process related to immigration enforcement in the United States where an alien is denied entry to and/or physically removed from the country, without going through the normal removal proceedings (which involve hearings before an immigration judge). The legal authority for expedited removal (in the Illegal Immigration Reform and Immigrant Responsibility Act of 1996 (IIRIRA)) allows for its use against most unauthorized entrants who have been in the United States for less than two years. Its rollout so far has been restricted to people seeking admission and those who have been in the United States for 14 days or less, and excludes first-time violators from Mexico and Canada.

History

Legal authority given by IIRIRA (passed 1996, effective 1997) 
Expedited removal was first introduced in United States immigration law as part of the IIRIRA, passed by the 104th U.S. Congress and signed into law by then U.S. President Bill Clinton.

The IIRIRA gave the U.S. Immigration and Naturalization Service (the name for the umbrella organization responsible for immigration enforcement at the time) the authority to remove from the United States, without the need for a hearing before an immigration judge, people who:

 are either applicants for admission to the United States or satisfy the following conditions: have entered the United States without admission or advance parole, and have been continuously physically present in the United States for less than two years,
 are inadmissible under certain statutory grounds primarily due to failure to comply with visa or other entry document requirements, and/or fraud or misrepresentation,
 make no claim to lawful permanent resident status, and
 do not seek asylum or express a fear of persecution.

Initial implementation at ports of entry (1997) 
Starting April 1997, when the IIRIRA came into force, the INS implemented expedited removal only against noncitizens seeking admission at designated ports of entry (such as airports and sea ports).

Expansion to arrivals by sea and formalization of credible fear screening (2002) 
In November 2002, the INS expanded the application of expedited removal to people satisfying these three conditions:

 entered the U.S. by sea, either by boat or other means,
 were not admitted or paroled into the U.S.
 have not been continuously present in the U.S. for at least two years.

Given that expedited removal now included people who were already present in the United States, and therefore might affect people eligible for asylum, the INS also introduced a credible fear screening process for those who indicated that they might be eligible for asylum.

Expansion to a 100-mile border zone and all people within 14 days of arrival (2004) 
In 2004, the United States Department of Homeland Security published an immediately effective notice in the Federal Register expanding the application of expedited removal to aliens who are encountered within 100 miles of any land or sea border and who entered the U.S. without inspection less than 14 days before the time they are encountered. U.S. Customs and Border Protection could therefore identify possible immigration violators anywhere in this 100-mile border zone and process them for expedited removal if they had been in the country for less than 14 days.

The notice clarified that, as a matter of prosecutorial discretion, the DHS would apply the expansions only to:

 third-country nationals (not from Mexico or Canada)
 Mexican or Canadian nationals with histories of criminal or immigration violations, such as smugglers or aliens who have made numerous illegal entries.

It also indicated that officers could exercise discretion not to commence expedited removal proceedings based on individual equities.

Rollout of expansion to border zone 
Due to resource constraints, the expansion of expedited removal to the entire border zone did not happen immediately. The implementation was done in three phases:

 Initially, the DHS implemented expedited removal against aliens in the Tucson (Arizona), McAllen (Texas), and Laredo (Texas) Border Patrol Sectors.
 In September 2005, expedited removal was expanded to all nine Border Patrol Sectors along the southwest border.
 In March 2006, it was announced that expedited removal had been implemented in the entire border zone.

Expansion nationwide up to two years after entry 
In July 2019, it was announced that expedited removal would be implemented to include "(1) aliens who did not arrive by sea, who are encountered anywhere in the United States more than 100 air miles from a U.S. international land border, and who have been continuously present in the United States for less than two years; and (2) aliens who did not arrive by sea, who are encountered within 100 air miles from a U.S. international land border, and who have been continuously present in the United States for at least 14 days but for less than two years."

Exceptions and government discretion
A number of de facto and de jure exceptions apply to expedited removal.

Asylum seekers 
Those who request to apply for asylum, or express a fear of persecution or torture when they make contact with immigration enforcement, are referred for a credible fear interview with a United States Citizenship and Immigration Services officer. If they are able to demonstrate to the officer that they have a credible fear of persecution or torture, they may no longer be subject to expedited removal, but go through a regular immigration hearing before a judge. If they fail to convince the USCIS officer that they have a credible fear of persecution or torture, they may be subject to expedited removal.

Mexican and Canadian nationals 
Mexican and Canadian nationals discovered within the border zone and without a history of criminal or immigration violations are placed in regular removal proceedings (that involve setting up a hearing before an immigration judge). Those arriving at a port of entry, or those with a history of criminal and immigration violations, could be subject to expedited removal.

Cuban nationals 
Prior to President Obama's re-formalization of diplomatic relations with Cuba, the United States followed a "wet feet, dry feet policy". Cubans already present in the United States were eligible to stay, and weren't subject to expedited removal proceedings. However, those who arrived at a designated port of entry could be subject to expedited removal.

As part of the re-normalization of diplomatic relations, on January 12, 2017, the Secretary of the Department of Homeland Security Jeh Johnson announced the following change:

"Beginning today, DHS has rescinded certain policies unique to Cuban nationals. Specifically, DHS has eliminated a special parole policy for arriving Cuban nationals commonly known as the 'wet-foot/dry-foot' policy, as well as a policy for Cuban medical professionals known as the Cuban Medical Professional Parole Program. It is now Department policy to consider any requests for such parole in the same manner as parole requests filed by nationals of other countries."

"DHS is also eliminating an exemption that previously prevented the use of expedited removal proceedings for Cuban nationals apprehended at ports of entry or near the border. The existing Cuban Family Reunification Parole Program is not affected by this announcement and remains in effect."

Status claimants 
Anybody who states under oath to a border agent that they are a citizen, lawful permanent resident, or asylee cannot be subject to expedited removal and gets an opportunity to appear before an immigration judge. Lying about one's status in these circumstances may make one inadmissible and could even lead to a lifetime bar to U.S. admission.

Voluntary return 
The officer at a designated port of entry may discretionarily give people being turned back the option of "voluntary return" as an alternative to expedited removal. A voluntary return also goes on the person's immigration record, but has fewer serious legal consequences for attempted future entry than an order of removal.

Procedure

Order of expedited removal 
After an immigration enforcement official (working for U.S. Customs and Border Protection) comes in contact with the person believed to be eligible for expedited removal, the official asks the person if they want to apply for asylum or fear persecution or torture if returned to their home country.

 If the person answers affirmatively, they are issued a Form M-444 Information About Credible Fear Interview and referred for a credible fear interview with a United States Citizenship and Immigration Service official.
 If the person answers negatively, or after the person answers positively but receives an unfavorable determination in the credible fear interview, the person is issued Form I-860 Notice and Order of Expedited Removal.
 The person may now be physically removed from the United States.

Contesting an expedited removal order 
An expedited removal order cannot be appealed. However, it is possible to submit a challenge to the order to the U.S. Customs and Border Protection to reconsider an expedited removal order. The challenge should be filed within 30 days of the decision. Based on the information and evidence provided, the CBP may exercise its discretion and overturn its prior expedited removal order. If an expedited removal order was issued at a designated port of entry such as an airport, the affected party may also file a complaint with the DHS's Traveler Redress Inquiry Program.

Effects on future admissibility to the United States
As far as the effects on future admissibility to the United States, expedited removal is treated similarly to ordinary removal. For first-time offenders who have not committed an aggravated felony and did not lie under oath, the typical ban length is five years. However, the ban could be a five-year, ten-year, twenty-year, or permanent ban based on the circumstances.

Related procedures 
A "Just Facts" summary by the Immigration Policy Center identified a few other summary removal practices similar to expedited removal:

 Reinstatement of removal: This applies to noncitizens who return illegally to the United States after having previously been deported. Essentially, DHS "reinstates" the original removal order without considering the individual's current situation, reasons for returning to the United States, or the presence of flaws in the original removal proceedings.
 Stipulated removal: Here, the person is formally charged and placed in immigration court proceedings before an immigration judge. However, the person does not actually appear before the judge, but rather agrees (or "stipulates") to deportation and gives up their right to a hearing. The immigration judge may enter the order of removal without seeing the person and asking them whether the stipulation was entered into knowingly and voluntarily.

Other procedures related to expedited removal include:

 Operation Streamline: This is a program where those caught crossing borders without authorization are subject to federal criminal charges.
 Administrative removal for aggravated felons: This is a process where those convicted of an aggravated felony may be removed immediately after finishing their prison term without going through removal proceedings.

Reception

Criticism from civil rights, constitutional rights, and immigrant rights perspectives 
A number of immigrant rights advocates have expressed concern about the lack of due process involved with expedited removal, both at designated ports of entry and for people in the border zone.

The National Immigration Law Center expressed concern about the expansion of expedited removal to the entire border zone considering that the concerns expressed by the United States Commission on International Religious Freedom regarding protections for asylum-seekers had not been adequately addressed. Similarly, the American Civil Liberties Union has argued that expedited removal can lead to many people who would qualify for asylum getting deported. The Immigration Policy Center noted that expedited removal proceedings and other rapid deportation decisions "often fail to take into account many critical factors, including whether the individual is eligible to apply for lawful status in the United States, whether he or she has long-standing ties here, or whether he or she has U.S.-citizen family members."

The American Civil Liberties Union has noted that the 100-mile "border zone" within which expedited removal can be carried out houses roughly 2/3 of the United States population, and has expressed concern about the implications of these broad enforcement powers for civil rights and constitutional protections.

Support from groups concerned with combating illegal immigration 
The Center for Immigration Studies, a group that advocates reduced immigration to the United States (both legal and illegal), has noted that expedited removal, as authorized by the IIRIRA, gave the executive branch sufficient power to deport a large fraction of illegal immigrants, but that the executive branch had been exceedingly cautious with its application.

See also 
 Credible fear
 Catch and release (U.S. immigration policy)
 Reinstatement of removal
 Stipulated removal
 Operation Streamline
 Withdrawal of application for admission
 Voluntary departure (United States)

References

External links 
 § 1235.3 Inadmissible aliens and expedited removal, USCIS
 A Primer on Expedited Removal, American Immigration Council

Immigration to the United States